Aaj is a 1987 Indian Hindi-language film, directed by Mahesh Bhatt and produced by Kuljeet Pal. It stars Raj Babbar, Smita Patil, Kumar Gaurav, Marc Zuber, and Anamika Pal. The film featured songs written by the Hindi poets Sudarshan Faakir and Madan Pal. Akshay Kumar made his first screen appearance with this film under his birth name ‘Rajiv Hari Om Bhatia’, in a bit role as a Karate instructor. Kumar further stated that he later chose the his official stage name as Akshay Kumar, after Gaurav's on-screen name in the film.

Story 
Akshay (Kumar Gaurav) is a youngster whose sister has been missing for a long time. Akshay often wanders around on the streets looking for her. One day he meets and befriends a girl (Anamika Pal), who helps him to search for his sister with him. The movie traces their search and the twists that their own lives take during this search.

Aaj is about Anjali Bakshi, an independent natured, head-strong daughter of a rich industrialist, who leaves no stone unturned to see her happy always! Arun Bakshi is not very pleased to see his daughter enjoy her job of Rs. 600/- a month as a reporter with News of India. At the local police station where she goes to investigate, Anjali meets Akshay, a young boy, dim in the head, looking for his missing elder sister, Kavita. This young man is not capable of doing anything except deliver flowers for a florist. Anjali gets interested in finding out more about Akshay's sister. And Akshay clings to her for moral and emotional support. When researching for a feature on missing persons, Anjali unfolds a story closely linked with her family, and she is left with no choice but to rebel. Anjali is already engaged to be married to Sumeet, who is not keen to have Akshay around. Sumeet and his doctor father try their best to keep Akshay away from their lives. They seem to know a family secret.

Cast

 Raj Babbar as Press Editor 
 Anamika Pal as Anjali
 Smita Patil as Kavita
 Kumar Gaurav as Akshay
 Ila Arun as Bharti
 Raj Kiran as Sumit
 Suresh Chatwal as Inspector Ghorpade
 Yusuf as Hitman
 Haidar Ali as Dr. J. J. Khosla
 Akshay Kumar as Karate Instructor (cameo appearance)
 Marc Zuber as Arun Baxi

Soundtrack

References

External links

1987 films
1980s Hindi-language films
Indian drama films
Films directed by Mahesh Bhatt